Cradle may refer to:
 Cradle (bed)
 Bassinet, a small bed, often on rockers, in which babies and small children sleep

Mechanical devices
 Cradle (circus act), or aerial cradle or casting cradle used in an aerial circus act
 Cradling (paintings), an art restoration technique to stabilise a painting on panel
 Docking station, also known as a cradle for the connection of a mobile device
 Ship cradle, for supporting a ship when dry docked
 Grain cradle, an addition to the agricultural scythe to keep the grain stems aligned when mowing
 Newton's cradle, a device that demonstrates conservation of momentum and energy via a series of swinging spheres
 Rocker box, also known as a cradle used in mining to separate gold from alluvium
 Suspended cradle, a platform for accessing the exterior of buildings, used by among others window cleaners
 Slip catching cradle. a device used by cricketers to practice taking catches

A metaphor for humanity's origins
 Cradle of Humankind, a World Heritage Site near Johannesburg in South Africa, where many early hominid remains were discovered
 Cradle of civilization, any of the various regions regarded as the earliest centers of civilization
 Cradle of Liberty (disambiguation)

Geography
 Cradle Mountain, Tasmania
 Cradle Mountain-Lake St Clair National Park
 The Cradle (Washington), a peak in the Wenatchee Mountains

Books and Publications
 Cradle (novel), a 1988 novel by Arthur C. Clarke and Gentry Lee

 Cradle series by Will Wight.

Films
 The Cradle (1922 film)

Music
 Cradle (Malay band), a Malay rock band from Singapore
 The Pleasure Seekers (band), formerly Cradle, a band that Suzi Quatro played in before she became famous
 The Cradle (album), an album by Colour Revolt
 Cradle (album), an album by Acacia
 "The cradle", song by Anthony Holborne (?1545-1602)
 "Cradle" (Atomic Kitten song), 1999
 "Cradle" (The Joy Formidable song)
 "Cradle", a song by Mudvayne from L.D. 50

Video games
 Cradle (video game), a 2015 science-fiction adventure game developed by Flying Cafe

Visual arts
 The Cradle (Morisot painting), a painting by Berthe Morisot

Other
 The Cradle, adoption agency founded by Louis W. Sauer
 Cradle (wrestling), a very basic move in amateur wrestling